is a fictional character and the main protagonist of the comic fantasy-themed light novel, manga and anime series Slayers. Lina Inverse is a young yet very powerful sorceress travelling the world in search of adventure and treasure. Lina has been consistently voiced by Megumi Hayashibara in Japanese, dubbed by Lisa Ortiz in the English version of the TV series and by Cynthia Martinez in the English version of the films and original video animation episodes. Slayers novels are narrated by Lina herself from her point of view.

Lina was one of the most popular anime characters of the late 1990s and has since retained a sizable fan following. There have been also characters based on or inspired by her in both Slayers and in other works.

Creation and design

The Slayers creator Hajime Kanzaka had originally created the characters of Lina and Luna (the name of Lina's unseen sister in Slayers) as the heroines of his science-fiction story that he had written when he was in high school and in which Luna was the protagonist and Lina was her clone. Years later, when Kanzaka began writing Slayers as a Western-style fantasy saga of Lina Inverse, his friend and the series' illustrator Rui Araizumi took an inspiration for her visual design when he by chance came upon a vintage film with the actress Audrey Hepburn on TV. According to the NTUT's John Lance Griffith, "To the extent that Lina is an independent, powerful woman ('a girl today' in contrast to the traditional Japanese woman), she follows in the tradition of Western lady knights and sorceresses: the tradition of Spenser's Britomart, of Tolkien's Arwen and Eowyn."

As envisioned by Kanzaka, Lina has a petite body type and is 147 cm (4 feet 10 inches) tall. She has two moles on her forehead, which are usually covered by her headband. Despite her supposed to be having a very flat chest, so much she can be confused for a boy, Lina is often depicted by Araizumi with larger breasts due to his personal preferences, which would be then carried over to much of other media too. Lina's appearance whilst wearing her homeland's folk clothing in the film Slayers: The Motion Picture is a nod to Ranma Saotome, the titular character from Ranma ½, who too (like Lina) is voiced by Megumi Hayashibara in Japanese.

Character and appearances

Lina Inverse
Lina Inverse was born in the fictional country of Zephilia. Since her mother used to be a mercenary magic user, Lina, suffering from inferiority complex to her sister, decided she would like to be a sorceress and coaxed her parents to send her to the Sorcerer's Guild school. Her older sister, the Knight of Shiphied Luna Inverse, was the darling of both her parents and the town, excelling in martial studies and quickly beginning to make a name for herself. Although Lina has faced down dragons, monsters, and even dark lords with little fear, the mere mention of Luna's name sends her into terrified hysterics. When Lina was a child, she sold images of Luna naked in order to earn money and, in turn, Luna punished Lina so severely that Lina has feared her ever since.

Lina has many different nicknames, including "Bandit Killer" and "Dragon Spooker", neither of which she likes. To her, her most embarrassing nickname is "Lina the Pink", which is her official title amongst the Guild. In the light novel, manga, film and OVA prequel stories, Lina meets an unhinged and secretive sorceress calling herself Naga the Serpent and maniacally obsessed with Lina, with whom she then travels with and often ends up fighting against during their adventures. During that time, Lina earns her reputation of someone who tracks and destroys numerous bandits for fun and profit, stealing their ill-gotten gains for their own use. In Slayers Revolution, Lina embarks on pirate hunting after bandits have become an "endangered species". According to Kanzaka, Lina and her self-proclaimed rival Naga are the mightiest human magic users in the world of Slayers; while Naga has a larger potential magical capacity, Lina knows the ultimate black magic spells, notably the devastating Dragon Slave, which is her famed signature attack.

Although she is an adolescent (between 15 and 17 years old in most stories), she is an extremely powerful mage, with a great love for money, treasure (especially the magical sort) and food. In the anime and manga (but not the light novels), Lina recklessly uses overly destructive magic, often with little provocation (though depicted lightheartedly). As such, she is widely reputed to be an evil and calamitous "Enemy of All Who Live", among many other similar monikers (such as "Empress of Destruction", "Natural Disaster Mage", "Raven-Black Witch" and "No-Breasts Demon"). In spite of her infamy and an underdeveloped body, Lina likes to see herself as a genial, dignified, and beautiful sorceress.

Adding to her mental instability, she is also selfish, short-tempered and gluttonous, and suffers an inferiority complex over her chest size, especially when alongside the very busty Naga who likes to taunt Lina over this. Lina's accomplishments include the destruction of a piece of the Mazoku Lord Shabranigdo and having a hand in the destruction of the lesser demon overlords such as Gaav and Hellmaster Phibrizzo, as well as defeating Dark Star, Shabranigdo's counterpart from another universe. Due to these accomplishments, she is increasingly piquing the interest of the Mazoku demonkind and has become a frequent target of their schemes and attacks.

At the beginning of the main series, Lina meets a swordsman named Gourry Gabriev and a chimera boy named Zelgadis Greywords. Lina encounters and destroys a part of Shabranigdo with her ultimate Giga Slave spell, which draws power from the Lord of Nightmares, the highest deity of the Slayers universe, but has no plans to ever use it again after almost ending the world. She befriends a princess named Amelia Wil Tesla Seyruun and the priestess Sylphiel Nels Lahda. She later meets a mysterious priest Xellos and gets caught between Chaos Dragon Gaav and Hellmaster Phibrizzo. In the anime-exclusive series Slayers Try, Lina is recruited by the dragoness Filia Ul Copt to save the world. In Slayers Revolution, Lina gets arrested on false pretense which later comes leading her on a journey against another incarnation of the Demon Beast Zannafar. She also meets an odd little creature named Pokota, who too has the ability to use the Dragon Slave.

Lina and Gourry have traveled with each other ever since they met, and they have been featured in every form of Slayers media that takes place in the timeline after they meet. Lina appears to fall in love with Gourry, once even risking the destruction of the universe in order to save him. There is a distinct lack of romantic development in the series, even after it is affirmed that Lina and Gourry love each other. Kanzaka addressed this by jokingly stating that he is not adept in writing romantic scenes. The final climax of Slayers Next, the second season of the Slayers TV series, the two characters share a kiss, though they cannot later recall the incident. However, both Gourry and Lina remember that something important had happened between them. In any media taking place after the two met, they have been featured together and should they ever get separated, are never apart for too long. The audio drama Slayers Kita Kaette EX #4, which provides a pseudo-closure to the entire Slayers saga (since it was made before Slayers Evolution-R), features the retired Lina and Naga, both now elderly in their eighties (with almost all other characters already deceased) and vacationing together while still quarreling and fighting each other.

Lina is also the main protagonists through the entire official series of the non-canonical Slayers role-playing video games from the 1990s, and further appears as a player character or an avatar option in the role-playing video games Heroes Phantasia and Fantasia Re:Build, with Naga in the action video game Magical Battle Arena and in the role-playing video game Valkyrie Anatomia, with Gourry in the role-playing video game La Tale and again in Valkyrie Anatomia, with both Naga and Gourry in the role-playing video game Granblue Fantasy, and with them as well as other Slayers main characters in LINE Rangers, Puzzle & Dragons, Tales of the Rays, Overlord: Mass for the Dead, Ragnarok M (only in China) and Guardian Tales. Her character has been also featured in a range of Slayers merchandise, such as food in the Slayers theme cafe in Tokyo, many various figurines and dolls, including Nendoroid and Dollfie among others, licensed cosplay outfits, a perfume line, and even an augmented and virtual reality compatible digital figure.

Derived characters
Several different versions of Lina populate the world of Slayers due to various plots. In one story from the prequels, Lina and Naga are exposed to a mirror that creates an exact opposite of whoever looks in it. The wizard using it expects this to produce dark and violent version of the two that would side with him and destroy the originals, but the mirror copies turn out sweet, kind, generous, and extremely concerned about the feelings of each other and everyone around them. In their attempts to break the spell, Lina and Naga actually wind up creating dozens of such doppelgängers of themselves, which go on to found an entire village full of philanthropic Linas and Nagas. A slightly adapted version of this story, which resulted in the mirror being destroyed without creating more than the initial copies, served as the basis of the Slayers Special OAV episode "Mirror Mirror".

In the Slayers TV series, Gourry and Lina are both the subject of an attempt at cloning, which spawns a number of miniature, super deformed versions of them both; the tiny clones fight to humorous effect, and after the mini Linas win, they all disintegrate. Even more, in this case mostly lifelike, clones of Lina were created by Xellos' master Zellas Metallium in the video game Slayers in which one of them, who believes herself to be the real Lina, is a playable character and the game's initial protagonist. Furthermore, a super deformed, giant, toylike fighting golem named "Piko-Piko Lina-chan" is constructed in the film Slayers Great in a distorted image of Lina's that emphasises her kawaii (cute) attributes, much to Lina's dismay and anger as she believed she had been chosen to model for its creation because of her (self-imagined) great beauty; it is also featured in the video game Slayers Royal 2.

In the science fiction themed Lost Universe, Hajime Kanzaka's another media franchise set in a universe parallel to that of Slayers, the traits and personas of Lina and Gourry were mixed together to create its male protagonist, Kain Blueriver. The manga miniseries Slayers Light Magic features a young boy named Light Inverse who dreams to become a mage in a scientifically advanced futuristic world.

Reception

Lina Inverse has become a popular and critically praised character both in Japan and overseas; writing in 1999, Dave Halverson called Slayers''' Lina and Naga "two of anime [medium]'s brightest stars in both Japan and the U.S." Lina won Animage magazine's Anime Grand Prix 1998 award for the best female character of 1997, also placing second in 1997 (after Rei Ayanami, also voiced by Megumi Hayashibara), fourth in 1996, and eight in 1999. In 2000, she won the Best of Dragon Magazine popular vote in two categories, including  Best Heroine. In 2004, readers of the Japanese magazine Animedia voted her the seventh most popular female character in the Animedia 23rd Anniversary Anime Awards.

Retrospectively, Japanese magazine Famitsu declared her the 15th top anime heroine of the 1990s. In 2020, from Anthony Gramuglia from Comic Book Resources ranked her and Usagi Tsukino from Sailor Moon as the best anime heroines of the 1990s, describing them as "two fantastic characters who have remained popular and iconic for decades." The voice of Lina Inverse has since remained one of Hayashibara's best known roles. Lina's local dubbing also became one of the most popular roles of Emanuela Pacotto in Italy.

Lina has been also included in many top lists by various websites. For example, The Mary Sue's Citlin Donovan included her among "Six Leading Ladies of Shonen Anime" and the SBS PopAsia's Jamaica dela Cruz named her as number one "baddest anime female". Anime News Network's Lynzee Loveridge put "Lina Inverse and Company" at second spot in "Traditional Fantasy Parties", while Gia Manry from the same website ranked her first among all anime's "Easiest Good Guys to Make Angry", as well as placing Lina second on her lists of "Destroyers of the Fourth Wall" and "Most Destructive Heroes".

Cultural impact
The character's enduring popularity led to several cameo appearances in various other media, including the role-playing game Ironclaw (a fangame furry style homage on the First Edition cover, along with Naga), the video game Shadow Warrior (in an in-game poster), and in the first episode of the anime series Full Metal Panic! (shown on a cover of Dragon Magazine). The protagonists of the 2002 anime miniseries Cosplay Complex, Chako and Reika, dress up as Naga and Lina in the third episode, and Lina and Naga themselves made a cameo appearance in French comic book series Les Légendaires Origines in 2014.

A Slayers-inspired player character Lina is part of the Dota video game series: in the Warcraft III mod Defense of the Ancients, she shares the name of "Lina Inverse", while simply going by "Lina" in Dota 2 and is referred to as "Lina the Slayer" in the games lore; in both games, she is a redhead whose spells' names reference these in Slayers: "Dragon Slave", "Light Strike Array" (Explosion Array), and "Laguna Blade" (Ragna Blade). Lina and her "Dragon Slave" are also parodied in the 2012 anime series Love, Chunibyo & Other Delusions (in the episode "Regret of... the Scriptures of Darkness (Mabinogion)") and in the 2015 American animated series Star vs. the Forces of Evil'' (in the episode "The Battle for Mewni").

See also
List of Slayers characters

References

Animated human characters
Anime and manga characters who use magic
Fantasy film characters
Fantasy television characters
Female characters in anime and manga
Female soldier and warrior characters in anime and manga
Fictional characters based on real people
Fictional characters who break the fourth wall
Fictional characters who can manipulate darkness or shadows
Fictional characters who can manipulate light
Fictional characters with air or wind abilities
Fictional characters with earth or stone abilities
Fictional characters with electric or magnetic abilities
Fictional characters with energy-manipulation abilities
Fictional characters with fire or heat abilities
Fictional characters with healing abilities
Fictional characters with ice or cold abilities
Fictional characters with neurological or psychological disorders
Fictional characters with water abilities
Fictional female swordfighters
Fictional shamans
Fictional swordfighters in anime and manga
Fictional witches
Literary characters introduced in 1989
Slayers characters
Teenage characters in anime and manga